Davide Leto (born 4 November 1994) is an Italian professional footballer who plays as a midfielder for FC Isola Capo Rizzuto.

Career
Born in Crotone, Leto finished his graduation in hometown's Crotone's youth system, and made his first-team debut on 13 May 2013, coming on as a second-half substitute in a 1–1 draw at Varese.

He appeared in his second match six days later, again from the bench, in a 3–3 home draw against Juve Stabia.

On 16 August 2019, Leto returned to FC Isola Capo Rizzuto for the second time.

References

External links
 
 

1994 births
Living people
People from Crotone
Italian footballers
F.C. Crotone players
Avezzano Calcio players
A.S. Martina Franca 1947 players
S.E.F. Torres 1903 players
S.S.D. Città di Campobasso players
Serie B players
Serie C players
Serie D players
Association football midfielders
Footballers from Calabria
Sportspeople from the Province of Crotone